Cana (formerly, Missouri Bend) was a town in Butte County, California, located on the former Southern Pacific Railroad line. It lies at an elevation of 167 feet (51 m). A post office operated in Cana from 1871 to 1913, with brief closures in 1895 and 1900.  In the 1870s, the community was on the stage coach routes from Chico; the population then was about 100, mostly farmers growing wheat.

References

Unincorporated communities in California
Unincorporated communities in Butte County, California